Keith Carl Karpinski (born October 12, 1966) is a former American football linebacker. He played for the Detroit Lions in 1989.

College career
Karpinski attended and played college football at the Penn State University from 1984 to 1988.

Professional career
Karpinski was selected in the eleven round (#282 overall) of the 1989 NFL Draft by the Detroit Lions.

Personal life
Karpinski was a current Principal at Thomas Jefferson Elementary School in Sterling Heights, Michigan. Karpinski married with Marilyn in 1991 and he has two daughters.

References 

Living people
Penn State Nittany Lions football players
1966 births
American football linebackers
Detroit Lions players
Players of American football from Michigan